The Phenomenon of Craving is an EP by the Santa Cruz, California-based hardcore punk band Good Riddance, released May 23, 2000 through Fat Wreck Chords. A portion of the proceeds from this album benefit the Homeless Garden Project in Santa Cruz, CA. Their drummer Sean Sellers had left the band in December 1999, so Dave Raun of Lagwagon drummed on the EP and on several tours with the band. A full-time replacement would be found in Kid Dynamite's Dave Wagenschutz, who joined the band for their fifth album Symptoms of a Leveling Spirit the following year.

Reception 
Mark Cyst of The Big Takeover gave the EP two and a half stars out of five, stating that "Good Riddance don't do much more than show that they are still angry, and that they still play hardcore ... I've heard much better material on the band's earlier efforts."

Track listing

Personnel 
 Russ Rankin – vocals
 Luke Pabich – guitar
 Chuck Platt – bass guitar
 Dave Raun – drums
 Bill Stevenson – producer, recording and mix engineer
 Stephen Egerton – producer, recording and mix engineer
 Jason Livermore – producer, recording and mix engineer
 Ramon Breton – mastering

References

External links 
The Phenomenon of Craving at Fat Wreck Chords

Good Riddance (band) albums
2000 EPs
Fat Wreck Chords EPs
Albums produced by Bill Stevenson (musician)